The Coast is the debut EP from Toronto, Ontario, Canada-based indie rock group The Coast. The EP was first self-released in Canada on March 7, 2006, then released in the US by Aporia Records on May 29, 2007. The EP was produced by the band and Chris Hegge, who also provided backing vocals on "Evening's Heights." In 2004, when The Coast was known as The July 26th Movement, they released an EP titled Take a Walk Outside, featuring an early version of the song of the same name found on the self-titled EP.

The EP garnered critical acclaim in Canadian music press. Rob Bolton of Canadian music magazine Exclaim! hailed: "The Coast are yet another example of the increasingly talented and seemingly unstoppable Canadian indie music scene."

Track listing
All songs written by The Coast.

 "All Farewells" – 3:43
 "Circles" – 4:44
 "Take a Walk Outside" – 3:15
 "The Lines Are Cut" – 4:30
 "Evening's Heights" – 2:53
 "Harbour Lights" – 4:54

Credits
 The Coast are:
 Ian Fosbery – guitars
 Jordan Melchiorre – drums
 Luke Melchiorre – bass, vocals
 Ben Spurr – vocals, guitars
 Produced by Chris Hegge and The Coast.
 Additional vocals on track 5 by Chris Hegge.
 Engineered, recorded and mixed by Chris Hegge at Audiolab Recording Company, Toronto, Ontario.
 Mastered by Ryan A. Mills at Little King Studio, Toronto, Ontario.
 Cover photography by Elyse Connery.
 Inside jacket photography by Jess Baumung.
 Design by The Coast.
 The Coast Music #COCD0000001. Aporia Records #APCD-027.

References

External links 
 

2006 EPs
The Coast (band) albums